Litostigma is a genus of flowering plants belonging to the family Gesneriaceae.

Its native range is Southern Central China.

Species:

Litostigma coriaceifolium 
Litostigma crystallinum

References

Didymocarpoideae
Gesneriaceae genera